Jean Laborie (1919 - 1996) was a French  bishop of an independent Catholic church.

Biography 

Jean Laborie was born on 16 November 1919, and by his own account he spent his early life doing menial labouring jobs with no involvement in religion. In his forties he quickly discovered a vocation for religious life outside of the official Roman Catholic Church, and he was consecrated as an independent bishop on 2 October 1966 by Jean Pierre Danyel, a bishop of the Sainte Église Celtique. Later he was re-consecrated conditionally on 20 August 1968 by Louis Jean Stanislaus Canivet. He was re-consecrated conditionally a second time on 8 February 1977 by Traditionalist Catholic Archbishop Pierre Martin Ngo Dinh Thuc. Laborie later ordained Luc Jouret to the priesthood, before Jouret went on to conduct the 'Solar Temple' sect and mass suicides.

Further reading

References 

1919 births
1996 deaths
Thục line bishops
20th-century French people
French bishops